Morshead is a surname. Notable people with the surname include:

 Catherine Morshead, British television director
 E. D. A. Morshead (1849–1912), English classicist and teacher
 Henry Anderson Morshead (c. 1774–1831), Irish British Army officer
 Henry Morshead (1882–1931), English surveyor, explorer and mountaineer
 Leslie Morshead (1889–1959), Australian soldier, teacher, businessman, and farmer
 Owen Morshead (1893–1977),  British Army officer and Royal Librarian
 Sam Morshead (1955–2018), Irish jockey

See also
 Moorehead, surname
 Morshead baronets, title in the Baronetage of Great Britain.